Dappar railway station is a railway station located in Sahibzada Ajit Singh Nagar district, Punjab.

Trains

 14887/14888 Kalka–Barmer Express
 13008 Udyan Abha Toofan Express

References

External links
http://indiarailinfo.com/station/map/dappar-dhpr/2640

Ambala railway division
Railway stations in Sahibzada Ajit Singh Nagar district